Beefeater is a term often used to refer to the Yeomen Warders of the Tower of London, but originally referring to the Yeomen of the Guard.

Beefeater may also refer to:
Beefeater Gin, a British brand of spirits
Beefeater (restaurant), a chain of pub restaurants in the UK, owned by Whitbread Group PLC
The Beefeaters, a Danish beat group (1964–1971)
Beefeater (band), a short-lived American punk rock band
Beefeater (comics), a DC Comics superhero from England who bore a similarity to Basil Fawlty
The Byrds, an American rock band originally named the Beefeaters